2-Hydroxy-3-methyl-2-cyclopenten-1-one  is an organic compound related to 1,2-cyclopentanedione.  It is the enol tautomer of the diketone 3-methylcyclopentane-1,2-dione.  Being an enol, the compound is often called methylcyclopentenolone.  It is a colorless solid.

Synthesis and structure
The compound is prepared by base-catalyzed condensation of 1‐hydroxyhexane‐2,5‐dione, a derivative of hydroxymethylfurfural.

The structure has been confirmed by X-ray crystallography.
Quantum calculations also indicate that the enol is strongly favored relative to the diketo tautomer.  Furthermore, the enolization occurs at the methyl-substituted carbon.

Use and occurrence
It is one of many products from the pyrolysis of lignocellulose.

It is used in flavors and perfumery for its maple- or caramel-like odor.  It contributes to the flavor or odor of many foods including wines, coffee, paprika, and salmon.  It is sometimes called maple lactone because it occurs in maple syrup (it is not, however, a lactone).

See also
 1,2-Cyclopentanedione

References

Diketones
Cyclopentanes